The 2021 Guaranteed Rate Skate America was the first event in the 2021–22 ISU Grand Prix of Figure Skating, a senior-level international invitational competition series. It was held at the Orleans Arena in Las Vegas, Nevada on October 22–24. Medals were awarded in the disciplines of men's singles, women's singles, pairs, and ice dance. Skaters earned points toward qualifying for the 2021–22 Grand Prix Final.

Entries 
The International Skating Union announced the preliminary assignments on June 29, 2021.

Changes to preliminary assignments

Results

Men

Women

Pairs

Ice dance

References

External links 
 Skate America at the International Skating Union
 
 Results

2021 Skate America
2021 in figure skating
2021 in American sports
October 2021 sports events in the United States
Sports competitions in the Las Vegas Valley